Tillandsia myriantha is a species of flowering plant in the genus Tillandsia. This species is native to Colombia and Venezuela.

References

myriantha
Flora of Colombia
Flora of Venezuela